Foyleside Shopping Centre is a shopping centre in Derry, County Londonderry, Northern Ireland. Construction started in the early 1990s and the centre opened in 1995. The shopping centre's purpose was to offer a hub for shopping in the North West of Ireland.

The shopping centre is built into the centre of the city and although it is not on the bank, it does overlook the River Foyle.

Proposals
This has the potential to create 500 construction jobs and 300 permanent jobs if allowed to proceed. This development would cost in the region of £100 million. Further to this Minister for Regional Development, Conor Murphy has hinted that he would welcome any plans for the relocation of the current railway station to the east bank of the Peace Bridge, which officially opened on Saturday 25 June 2011

References

External links
Foyleside website

1995 establishments in Northern Ireland
Shopping malls established in 1995
Shopping centres in Northern Ireland
Buildings and structures in Derry (city)
Tourist attractions in Derry (city)